Forsteropsalis is a genus of harvestmen (Opiliones) endemic to New Zealand. Males of this genus have exaggerated chelicerae weapons used in male-male competition.  Forsteropsalis are opportunistic omnivores that both capture live prey and scavenge dead animal matter.  The diet includes various insects, arachnids, spiders, millipedes, amphipods, and annelid worms.

Species 
 Forsteropsalis bona Taylor & Probert, 2014
 Forsteropsalis chiltoni (Hogg, 1910)
 Forsteropsalis distincta (Forster, 1964)
 Forsteropsalis fabulosa (Phillipps & Grimmett, 1932)
 Forsteropsalis grayi (Hogg, 1920)
 Forsteropsalis grimmetti (Forster, 1944)
 Forsteropsalis inconstans (Forster, 1944)
 Forsteropsalis marplesi (Forster, 1944)
 Forsteropsalis nigra (Forster, 1944)
 Forsteropsalis photophaga Taylor & Probert, 2014
 Forsteropsalis pureora Taylor, 2013
 Forsteropsalis tumida (Forster, 1944)
 Forsteropsalis wattsi (Hogg, 1920)

References

Harvestmen
Arachnids of New Zealand